Gallinari is an Italian surname. Notable people with the surname include:

Danilo Gallinari (born 1988), Italian basketball player
Prospero Gallinari (1951–2013), Italian terrorist
Vittorio Gallinari (born 1958), Italian basketball player and sports agent, father of Danilo Gallinari

Italian-language surnames